Qaraibad (also, Karaibat) is a village in Baku, Azerbaijan.

References 

Populated places in Baku